Susan Johnson is an American Democratic Party politician currently serving as a member of the Connecticut House of Representatives from the 49th district, which encompasses part of Windham, since 2009. Johnson was first elected in 2008 and currently serves as a member of the House's Housing Committee, Appropriations Committee, and Education Committee.

References

External links

Living people
1951 births
Democratic Party members of the Connecticut House of Representatives
People from Bangor, Maine
People from Windham, Connecticut
21st-century American politicians
21st-century American women politicians
Eastern Connecticut State University alumni
Western New England University alumni